Makar Denisovich Ignatov (born 21 June 2000) is a Russian figure skater. He is the 2019 CS Nebelhorn Trophy champion, 2019 Rostelecom Cup bronze medalist, 2016 Cup of Nice bronze medalist and 2021 Russian national silver medalist.

In 2017, he won two medals on the ISU Junior Grand Prix series – silver in Latvia and bronze in Croatia.

Personal life
In September 2022, Ignatov received a summons to appear at the military commissariat for a potential call-up to serve in the Russian Army during the 2022 Russian mobilization.

Career

Early years 
Makar Ignatov began learning to skate in 2004. He missed two seasons due to knee problems and returned to competition in 2016. Making his international senior debut, he won bronze at the 2016 International Cup of Nice in mid-October. He finished fourth at the 2017 Russian Junior Championships after placing fifth in the short program and 3rd in the free skate.

2017–18 season 
Ignatov's junior international debut came in early September 2017 at a 2017–18 ISU Junior Grand Prix (JGP) competition in Riga, Latvia; ranked second in both segments, he won the silver medal. He received the bronze medal at his second JGP assignment in Zagreb, Croatia. With these results, he qualified for the 2017–18 JGP Final in Nagoya, Japan, where he placed fourth.

In October 2017, Ignatov competed in his first ISU Challenger Series event, the 2017 CS Minsk-Arena Ice Star, where he placed fifth. A month later, he placed seventh at the 2017 CS Tallinn Trophy. At the 2018 Russian Championships, he placed twelfth on the senior level and sixth at the junior event.

2018–19 season 
In the summer of 2018, Ignatov broke a bone in his right foot while practicing a jump at a training camp. He returned to competition in late November, at the Tallinn Trophy. In February, Ignatov placed fourth at the Russian Cup Final with first technical element score in the free skate. In March, he won the St. Petersburg Cup Final with two clean performances, including two quads and triple Axels in each of the programs.

2019–20 season 
In late September, Ignatov won gold at the 2019 CS Nebelhorn Trophy after placing seventh in the short program and first in the free skate. He made his Grand Prix debut at the 2019 Rostelecom Cup, winning the bronze medal.  At his second Grand Prix assignment, the 2019 NHK Trophy, he placed seventh.

At the 2020 Russian Championships, Ignatov won the short program, making only a slight error on his quad toe loop and receiving low marks on his spins.  Fourth in the free skate after two step-outs and repeated spin level issues, he dropped to fourth place overall.

2020–21 season 
Ignatov debuted his programs at the Russian senior test skates, including the new quad loop. Competing on the domestic Cup of Russia series, he won bronze medals at the first stage in Syzran and the fourth stage in Kazan.

With the COVID-19 pandemic continuing to affect international travel, the ISU opted to run the Grand Prix based primarily on geographic location. Ignatov was assigned to the 2020 Rostelecom Cup, placing fourth in the short program and landing a clean quad loop but underrotating part of his jump combination.  He landed three quads in the free skate, including another loop, but dropped to seventh place overall.

Competing at the 2021 Russian Championships, Ignatov placed second in the short program with a clean skate, four points behind leader Mikhail Kolyada.  He struggled with some jump landings in the free skate, placing third in that segment behind Kolyada and Mark Kondratiuk, but remained in the silver medal position overall.

Following the national championships, Ignatov participated in the 2021 Channel One Trophy, a televised team event organized in lieu of the European Championships.  He was selected for the Red Machine team captained by Alina Zagitova.  He placed second in the short program and third in the free skate, and the Red Machine team claimed the trophy. Subsequently, he competed at the Russian Cup Final, which was widely assumed to be the deciding event for the second Russian men's berth at the 2021 World Championships in Stockholm.  He placed eighth at the event.

2021–22 season 
Ignatov began the season on the Grand Prix at the 2021 Skate Canada International, where he finished fourth. He finished fourth as well at this second event, 2021 NHK Trophy. 

At the 2022 Russian Championships, Ignatov finished in tenth place. In February, he participated in Russian Cup Final. He placed third in the short program but skated a strong free program and went to win first place.

Records and achievements
The first Russian and also European skater to have landed four quads in the free skate and also six quads in two programs. He landed 4Lo and 4T-3T in his short program as well as 4Lo, 4S, 4T-3T and 4T in the free skate at the 2021 NHK Trophy.

Programs

Competitive highlights 
GP: Grand Prix; CS: Challenger Series; JGP: Junior Grand Prix

Detailed results 
Small medals for short and free programs awarded only at ISU Championships.

Senior level

Junior level

References

External links 
 
 

2000 births
Russian male single skaters
Living people
Figure skaters from Saint Petersburg